Andy Murray was the defending champion, but he was eliminated by Juan Mónaco in the second round.
4th seed David Ferrer defeated Lucky loser Marcel Granollers 7–5, 6–3 in the final match.

Seeds

Draw

Finals

Top half

Bottom half

Qualifying

Seeds

Qualifiers

Lucky losers

  Marcel Granollers
  Albert Ramos-Viñolas

Draw

First qualifier

Second qualifier

Third qualifier

Fourth qualifier

External links
 Main draw
 Qualifying draw

Singles